Jonnie Efraimsson (born 15 August 1958) is a former Swedish football player.

During his club career, Efraimsson played for Hammarby Fotboll, IFK Norrköping and Motala AIF.

Efraimsson made a single appearances for the Sweden national football team, coming in 1981.

External links

1958 births
Swedish footballers
Sweden international footballers
Hammarby Fotboll players
IFK Norrköping players
Motala AIF players
Association football defenders
Living people